WJWS-LP (93.7 FM) was a radio station licensed to serve the community of Jasper, Indiana. The station was owned by Greater Jasper Consolidated Schools. It aired a variety format.

The station was assigned the WJWS-LP call letters by the Federal Communications Commission (FCC) on February 18, 2014.

Greater Jasper Consolidated Schools surrendered WJWS-LP's license to the FCC on August 1, 2022, and it was cancelled the same day.

The radio station was replaced by WJPR, and started airing on August 29, 2022 with a new name; 91.7 The Curve.

References

External links
 Official Website
 

JWS-LP
JWS-LP
Radio stations established in 2014
2014 establishments in Indiana
Variety radio stations in the United States
Dubois County, Indiana
High school radio stations in the United States
Defunct radio stations in the United States
Radio stations disestablished in 2022
2022 disestablishments in Indiana